Longbridge is an area in the south-west of Birmingham, England, located near the border with Worcestershire.

Public Transport 
Longbridge is described as a hub for public transport with a number of bus services run by Kev's Coaches and National Express West Midlands passing through it with destinations including Birmingham City Centre, West Bromwich and the Queen Elizabeth Hospital in Edgbaston. West Midlands Railway serves Longbridge railway station on the Cross City Line, with destinations at Redditch or Bromsgrove and Four Oaks or Lichfield with connections to Hereford and Nottingham at University station or nationwide at Birmingham New Street station. In 2020 a large multi-storey carpark was built near Longbridge station as a park and ride facility to reduce car journeys into the city centre. Some improvements to Longbridge station were also carried out in 2020 though one side of the station remains without a lift facility.

Situation 

Longbridge is surrounded by Frankley, Frankley Beeches, Rubery, Rednal, Bromsgrove, Northfield, West Heath and Kings Norton. Longbridge is in close proximity to and can be viewed from the Lickey Hills.

Longbridge plant 

Since 1906, the area has been dominated by the Longbridge plant, which produced Austin, Nash Metropolitan, Morris, British Leyland, and most recently MG Rover cars. The factory became dormant, and some parts of the older sections of the site were demolished after MG Rover fell into administration in April 2005. The plant was one of the main employers of the local population and the resultant layoffs caused local decline. The company, renamed MG Motor (owned by MG Rover's would-be partner Shanghai Automotive Industry Corporation) resumed limited MG TF sports car production within a small portion of the factory in August 2008 and in late 2010 started final assembly of the MG6. Production ceased completely in 2017, when the Chinese car maker decided to ship the fully assembled cars to the UK. The remaining disused sections of the factory were demolished on 4 August 2006.

Regeneration 

25,410 people live in Longbridge.

Gary Sambrook of the Conservative Party is the Member of Parliament (MP) for Birmingham Northfield, representing the seat since the December 2019 general election.

As part of the Ward of Longbridge And West Heath, Longbridge is represented on Birmingham City Council by Debbie Clancy (Conservative Party) and Brett O'Reilly (Labour Party) who was very narrowly elected at the 2018 Birmingham City Council election.

Population 
The 2001 Population Census recorded that there were 30,964 people living in Longbridge with a population density of 3,789 people per km2 compared with 3,649 people per km2 for Birmingham. Longbridge has a small ethnic minority population: only 6.8% (2,117) of the ward's population consists of ethnic minorities, unlike more centralised areas such as Aston, Handsworth and Small Heath.

See also
St John the Baptist's Church, Longbridge

References

External links 
Birmingham City Council: Longbridge Ward
Longbridge Birmingham

Former wards of Birmingham, West Midlands
Areas of Birmingham, West Midlands
Northfield Constituency